Carry On Up the Jungle is a 1970 British adventure comedy film, the 19th release in the series of 31 Carry On films (1958–1992). The film marked Frankie Howerd's second and final appearance in the series. He stars alongside regular players Sid James, Charles Hawtrey, Joan Sims, Terry Scott and Bernard Bresslaw. Kenneth Connor returns to the series for the first time since Carry On Cleo six years earlier and would now feature in almost every entry up to Carry On Emmannuelle in 1978. Jacki Piper makes the first of her four appearances in the series. This movie is a send-up of the classic Tarzan films. It features an unusually dark tone for the series, as the protagonists are faced with certain death after they are apprehended by a cannibalistic tribe in the jungle.

Plot

Camp ornithologist Professor Inigo Tinkle (Frankie Howerd) tells a less-than-enraptured audience about his most recent ornithological expedition to the darkest, most barren regions of the African wilds in search for the legendary Oozlum bird, which is said to fly in ever decreasing circles until it disappears up its own rear end. Financing the expedition is Lady Evelyn Bagley (Joan Sims) and the team are led by the fearless (and lecherous) Bill Boosey (Sid James) and his slow-witted African guide Upsidasi (Bernard Bresslaw). Also on the expedition is Tinkle's idiotic assistant, Claude Chumley (Kenneth Connor) and June (Jacki Piper), Lady Bagley's beautiful but unappreciated maidservant. The journey does not get off to a good start, with a mad gorilla terrorising the campsite and the travellers realising they have ventured into the territory of the bloodthirsty "Noshas", a tribe of feared cannibals.

On the first night of the expedition, at dinner Lady Bagley reveals that she has embarked on the journey to find her long-lost husband and baby son who vanished twenty years ago on their delayed honeymoon, whilst out on a walk. Her husband is believed to have been eaten by a crocodile, but she hopes to find her baby son, Cecil's, nappy pin as something to remember him by. What the group do not know is that watching them from the bushes is Ug (Terry Scott), a bungling yet compassionate Tarzan-like jungle dweller that wears a loincloth and sandals. Ug has never before seen any other white people, especially a woman. The next day, June stumbles across a beautiful oasis where she saves Ug from drowning and the two begin to fall in love.

That night, Ug wanders into camp and encounters Lady Bagley in her tent (mistaking it for June's tent) and she is astonished to see that Ug is wearing Cecil's nappy pin, and that Ug is in fact her lost son Cecil. But before they can be reunited, Ug flees in fear and Lady Bagley faints with shock. The next day, the travellers are kidnapped by the Noshas, but manage to bribe their way out of being cannibalised by giving the tribal witch doctor Tinkle's pocket watch. Tinkle however delays and promises the witch doctor that their gods will bestow a sign of thanks upon them. Intending rescue, Ug accidentally catapults himself into the Nosha camp and starts a fire. In the chaos, Ug, June and Upsidasi manage to escape but the enraged Noshas apprehend the other travellers and prepare to kill them.

As they wait to be put to death, they are suddenly rescued by the all-female Lubby-Dubby tribe led by the stunning Leda (Valerie Leon) from the Lost World of Aphrodisia. They are taken to Aphrodisia and meet the king of the tribe Tonka who turns out to be Lady Bagley's missing husband Walter Bagley (Charles Hawtrey) who was taken by the Noshas years ago, but saved and brought to Aphrodisia by the tribal women. Evelyn Bagley is infuriated that he never bothered to search for their missing son and laments she has seen him but has once again lost him. June and Ug are revealed to be living happily together and June is teaching Ug to speak English.

Bill Boosey, Prof. Tinkle and Chumley enjoy the attention given to them by the tribal women, and Tinkle and Chumley are stunned to find that their elusive Oozlum bird is in fact a sacred animal to the Lubby-Dubby females. It transpires that the Lubby-Dubbies need the menfolk to save themselves from extinction, as no males have been born in Aphrodisia for over a century. The men think their dreams have come true... until Leda makes it clear that the Lubby-Dubby women have no intention of letting them go. Tonka implies that the last man who tried to escape Aphrodisia was murdered by the tribe.

Lady Bagley is resentful of this work the men have been given and taking over control from her husband (Tonka) ensure the mates assigned to the men are the least attractive women in the tribe. Three months pass and the men now are fed up and Leda is outraged that none of their "mates" have gotten pregnant, so she overthrows Tonka and assumes his place, threatening harm to the men. However, Upsidasi arrives disguised as a woman and says he has brought soldiers to save them. Ug and June also search for their friends and Ug summons a stampede of animals to create chaos and enable the men to get away. During the confusion, Tinkle snatches the Oozlum bird, and the team escape along with Tonka. After the chaos, Leda and her army chase after the men, but are more interested in the trampled soldiers. She says to let the others go not needing them now that they have "some real men." Lady Bagley is reunited with her beloved son and the group return to England. Tinkle unveils his Oozlum bird to his audience... only to find it has apparently vanished up inside itself. June and Ug are happily married with a baby and live in a treehouse in the suburbs whilst Ug goes to work in a bowler hat, suit, and no shoes.

Cast
 Frankie Howerd as Professor Inigo Tinkle
 Sid James as Bill Boosey
 Charles Hawtrey as Walter Bagley/King Tonka
 Joan Sims as Lady Evelyn Bagley
 Kenneth Connor as Claude Chumley
 Bernard Bresslaw as Upsidasi
 Terry Scott as Ug the Jungle Boy/Cecil Bagley
 Jacki Piper as June
 Valerie Leon as Leda
 Reuben Martin as Gorilla
 Edwina Carroll as Nerda
 Danny Daniels as Nosha Chief
 Yemi Ajibadi as Witch Doctor
 Lincoln Webb as Nosha with girl
 Heather Emmanuel as Pregnant Lubi
 Verna Lucille MacKenzie as Gong Lubi
 Valerie Moore as Lubi Lieutenant
 Cathi March as Lubi Lieutenant
 Nina Baden-Semper as Girl Nosha (uncredited)
 Roy Stewart as Nosha (uncredited)
 John Hamilton as Nosha (uncredited)
 Willie Jonah as Nosha (uncredited)
 Chris Konyils as Nosha (uncredited)

Crew
 Screenplay – Talbot Rothwell
 Music – Eric Rogers
 Production Manager – Jack Swinburne
 Director of Photography – Ernest Steward
 Editor – Alfred Roome
 Art Director – Alex Vetchinsky
 Assistant Editor – Jack Gardner
 Camera Operator – James Bawden
 Assistant Director – Jack Causey
 Continuity – Josephine Knowles
 Make-up – Geoffrey Rodway
 Sound Recordists – RT MacPhee & Ken Barker
 Hairdresser – Stella Rivers
 Costume Designer – Courtenay Elliott
 Dubbing Editor – Colin Miller
 Titles – GSE Ltd
 Producer – Peter Rogers
 Director – Gerald Thomas

Filming and locations
 Filming dates – 13 October to 21 November 1969
 Maidenhead Library – The location for Professor Tinkle's lecture. The building is now demolished but the original site is directly opposite Maidenhead Town Hall, as featured in Carry On Doctor, Carry On Again Doctor and Carry On Behind.
 Clarence Crescent, Windsor - location of the very final scene of the movie

Pinewood Studios was used for both interior and exterior filming.

Production and casting
Carry On Up the Jungle is, in part, a parody of Hammer Film Productions' "Cavegirl" series: One Million Years B.C. (1966), Slave Girls (1967) and more particularly Edgar Rice Burroughs' Tarzan series of books and films.

Bernard Bresslaw learned all his native orders in Swahili; however, the "African" extras were of Caribbean origin and did not understand. But Sid James, who was born in South Africa, recognised it and congratulated him.

The storyline is partly referenced in the Christmas Special Carry On, when all the characters sit down for Christmas Dinner and eat the Oozlum bird instead of a traditional Turkey.

Charles Hawtrey (born November 1914) as Walter Bagley plays the father of Ugg/Cecil Bagley Terry Scott (born May 1927) despite being merely twelve and a half years his senior. Joan Sims (born May 1930) as Lady Bagley plays his mother though she is three years his junior.

The role of Professor Tinkle was written for Kenneth Williams, and the role of Jungle Boy was written for Jim Dale, but Williams was unavailable as he was preparing to star in his own series, The Kenneth Williams Show, and Dale turned down his part due to the character having limited dialogue.

Reception
The film was among the eight most popular movies at the UK box office in 1970.

In a diary entry for Saturday 3 April 1976, Kenneth Williams wrote about the film, which he watched on television that evening, in positive terms. "It was quite funny and at one point I was laughing aloud. I was staggered to see what they got away with!" He was particularly complimentary about Kenneth Connor and Terry Scott, less so about Sid James.

References

Bibliography
 
 
 
 
 Keeping the British End Up: Four Decades of Saucy Cinema by Simon Sheridan (third edition) (2007) (Reynolds & Hearn Books)

External links
 
 Carry On up the Jungle Location Guide at The Whippit Inn

1970 films
1970s adventure comedy films
1970s historical comedy films
1970s parody films
British adventure comedy films
British historical comedy films
British parody films
Up the Jungle
1970s English-language films
Films directed by Gerald Thomas
Films produced by Peter Rogers
Films set in Africa
Films shot at Pinewood Studios
Films with screenplays by Talbot Rothwell
1970 comedy films
1970s British films
Jungle adventure films